Phreata is a genus of moths in the subfamily Lymantriinae. The genus was erected by Francis Walker in 1865.

Species
Phreata glaucoalba Walker, 1865 Bolivia
Phreata subacta (Walker, 1855) Brazil (Rio de Janeiro)

References

Lymantriinae